Swinfen Hall is an 18th-century country mansion house, now converted into a hotel, situated at Swinfen, in the Lichfield District of Staffordshire in England. It is a Grade II* listed building.

The Hall was built in 1757 by Samuel Swynfen to a design by architect Benjamin Wyatt (father of James Wyatt), and remained the home of the Swinfen and Swinfen Broun families  for almost two hundred years.

Samuel Swynfen (of Swynfen) sold Swinfen Hall to his kinsman, Samuel Swinfen of Walbrook House.  The latter died without any children, and left his estate in his will to his nephew Samuel Grundy (the son of his sister Anne, who had married Thomas Grundy of Appleby, Leicestershire) — on the condition that he take the surname of Swinfen and procure an Act of Parliament to that effect.  Samuel Grundy (now Swinfen) duly changed his name by an Act of Parliament of 1748.

However in 1770, Samuel Swinfen also died without children and the Hall passed to his brother, Thomas Grundy, who also then changed his name to Swinfen, by an Act of Parliament of 1771.

Thomas Grundy (now Swinfen) was the grandfather of Samuel Swynfen whose will was contested in a series of trials from 1856 to 1864 and raised important questions of ethics in the legal profession.

The Hall was extended and improved in the early 20th century by Lieutenant-Colonel Michael Swinfen-Broun. On his death in 1948 the estate was bequeathed to the Church and City of Lichfield, and most of the land was sold off. The Hall stood unoccupied for many years until acquired in 1987 by the present owners and converted to a hotel.

Patience Swinfen, widowed daughter-in-law and heir of Samuel Swinfen, who died in 1854, was involved in a celebrated legal case related to his will.

See also
Grade II* listed buildings in Lichfield (district)
Listed buildings in Swinfen and Packington

References

External links

 

Grade II* listed buildings in Staffordshire
Hotels in Staffordshire
Houses completed in 1757
Lichfield District